Olivier Quint (born 29 November 1971) is a French former professional footballer and current manager of Basse-Goulaine.

Playing career 
Quint was born in Saint-Quentin, Aisne. He played professionally for CS Sedan Ardennes and Nantes. While at Nantes he scored as they won the 2001 Trophée des Champions.

Coaching career
In April 2008 it was confirmed, that Quint had been appointed player-coach of FC Montaigu from the 2008-09 season. He stayed there for two seasons, narrowly managing to keep the club's top flight team in the French Régional 1 in 2010. At the end of the season, in May 2010, he left the club by mutual agreement.

In 2010, he returned to the field as a player for AC Chapelain, in La Chapelle-sur-Erdre, a team playing in the Division d'Honneur. He played two seasons, before becoming a part of the club's technical staff, allegedly as a sports coordinator and responsible for the youth sector. From the 2014-15 season, he was promoted to the first team staff, as an assistant coach on the first team under manager Nordine Chaouch.

Ahead of the 2016-17 season, he was appointed head coach of AC Chapelain. He left the club ahead of the 2021-22 season, as he had been appointed manager of Basse-Goulaine.

References

External links
Olivier Quint at FCNA
Olivier Quint at L'Equipe

1971 births
Living people
People from Saint-Quentin, Aisne
Sportspeople from Aisne
Association football midfielders
French footballers
FC Rouen players
RC Épernay Champagne players
CS Sedan Ardennes players
FC Nantes players
Ligue 1 players
Ligue 2 players
Footballers from Hauts-de-France